Amerotyphlops is a genus of snakes in the family Typhlopidae.

Distribution
The 19 species of this genus are found from Mexico through South America.

Species
The following species are recognized as being valid.
Amerotyphlops amoipira 
Amerotyphlops arenensis 
Amerotyphlops brongersmianus 
Amerotyphlops caetanoi 
Amerotyphlops costaricensis 
Amerotyphlops illusorium 
Amerotyphlops lehneri 
Amerotyphlops martis 
Amerotyphlops microstomus 
Amerotyphlops minuisquamus 
Amerotyphlops montanum 
Amerotyphlops paucisquamus 
Amerotyphlops reticulatus 
Amerotyphlops stadelmani 
Amerotyphlops tasymicris 
Amerotyphlops tenuis 
Amerotyphlops trinitatus 
Amerotyphlops tycherus 
Amerotyphlops yonenagae 

Nota bene: A binomial authority in parentheses indicates that the species was originally described in a genus other than Amerotyphlops.

References

Further reading
Hedges, S. Blair; Marion, Angela B.; Lipp, Kelly M.; Marin, Julie; Vidal, Nicolas (2014). "A taxonomic framework for typhlopid snakes from the Caribbean and other regions (Reptilia, Squamata)". Caribbean Herpetology 49: 1–61. (Amerotyphlops, new genus, pp. 43–44).

Typhlopidae
 
Snake genera
Taxa named by Stephen Blair Hedges